Pristimantis celator is a species of frog in the family Strabomantidae. It is found on the Pacific versant of the western Andes in southern Colombia (Nariño Department) and northern Ecuador. It is a nocturnal frog that occurs in terrestrial bromeliads found on the sides of roads and in herbaceous vegetation in leafy cloud forests. It tolerates some habitat change as long as bromeliads are present, but is threatened by deforestation.

References

celator
Amphibians of the Andes
Amphibians of Colombia
Amphibians of Ecuador
Amphibians described in 1976
Taxa named by John Douglas Lynch
Taxonomy articles created by Polbot